This article describes the party affiliations of leaders of each member-state represented in the European Council during the year 2009. The list below gives the political party that each head of government, or head of state, belongs to at the national level, as well as the European political alliance to which that national party belongs. The states are listed from most to least populous. More populous states have greater influence in the council, in accordance with the system of Qualified Majority Voting.



Summary

List of leaders (1 January 2009)

 Supported by PD-L
 AKEL holds only observer status with the Party of the European Left.

Changes

Affiliation

 – Fianna Fáil, which held office under Brian Cowen, left the AEN and became an ELDR member.

Office-holder only

National party changes
On 27 March, Berlusconi's Forza Italia merged with other parties to form The People of Freedom. The successor party continued Forza Italia's EPP membership.

See also
Presidency of the Council of the European Union

Footnotes

External links
Council of the European Union (official website)

Lists of parties in the European Council